Mike Hawkins (born Mikkel Kauczki Cox on  in Aarhus, Denmark) is a Danish DJ and record producer. Throughout his career, he has performed in several countries including Belgium, the Netherlands, and the United States.

Hawkins has played with a number of other well-known DJs as well, including Trentemøller, Sébastien Léger, Ferry Corsten and Marcus Schössow. He has gained support in its releases from Sander van Doorn (whose label, Doorn Records, he has also published on), Ferry Corsten, Faithless, Erick Morillo, Fedde le Grand, Abel Ramos and others.

In 2010, Hawkins worked frequently with DJ Mag Top 100 DJs Marcus Schössow and Daniel Kandi. In 2011, he released tracks on the labels Virgin/EMI and Sony Music, among others.

In January 2016, he announced his departure from Spinnin' Records on social networks, along with Julian Jordan. He joined Armada Music soon after.

Background
Mikkel Kauczki Cox was born on 22 May 1991 in Aarhus, Denmark, where he was raised during his childhood. In high school, Hawkins became passionate about creating a rock band with his friends, although the idea faded within a year. When Hawkins grew older, he faced confusion about his future, dropping out of three different studies; where he has noted:

After this realization, Hawkins decided to pursue a career as a DJ and music producer.

Music career

2009–2012: Career beginnings and early success
Mike Hawkins made his debut in 2009, with his first release being an EP titled "Dark Matter/Into Sound". The EP was released on 21 September through the Spinnin' Records sub-label, Tone Diary.

In 2010, Mike Hawkins released the single "Get You Down" through the record label, Sound of Copenhagen. Soon after, on 15 October, Hawkins had three tracks featured in the worldwide radio program, BBC Radio 1's Essential Mix, including the single "Cherry Coke" in collaboration with Pablo Oliveros, which was set to be published in March 2011.

On 7 March 2011, Mike Hawkins was featured on the official remix EP of "Drive" by Kenneth Thomas featuring Roberta Harrison and Steve Taetz. On 13 September, he released the single "Just Be You" in collaboration with Thomas Sagstad and Pablo Oliveros, featuring the vocalist Greg Boyd. The song was released via Agape Music. On 27 September, the official remix EP for the track was released, also through Agape Music. The next month, Hawkins returned to the Spinnin' Records sub-label Tone Diary to release a two track EP with Pablo Oliveros titled "Not Another Anthem/Cherrycoke." The EP was released exclusively on Beatport on 17 October, before later being made available for iTunes on 21 October. On 24 October, Hawkins was featured on the official remix EP for the song "I Want You (To Want Me Back)" by Morten Hampenberg and Alexander Brown featuring Stine Bramsen. One month later, on 15 November, Hawkins was featured on the official EP for the song "On Your Own" by Serge Devant featuring Coyle Girelli.

In 2012, Mike Hawkins founded the record label, Megaton Records. On 13 February, he was featured on the official remix EP for "Raise The Floor" by Hampenberg and Alexander Brown featuring Pitbull, Fatman Scoop and Nabiha. On 19 March, the DJ collaborated with Pablo Oliveros and Greg Boyd again to release the single "Common Ground" via Oxygen, a sub-label by Spinnin' Records. On 28 May, Hawkins and Oliveros collaborated again for the song "Slump" which, like the duo's previous single, was released on the record label Oxygen. On 2 July, Hawkins released the single "Floripa" through his own label, Megaton Records. On 18 October, Hawkins and Oliveros teamed up again to release the single "This Is How We Roll" via Megaton Records.Soon after, Hawkins and Oliveros released the track "EXPAND" through Megaton Records.

2013–2015: Revolt and other releases

On 30 January 2013, Mike Hawkins released the song "Trigger Warning" via Megaton Records. Following that release was the song "SRSLY Cool" by Hawkins and Dem Slackers. On 15 July, he released the single "Jump!" in collaboration with the DJs Pablo Oliveros and Henry Fong via Hysteria Records. The song received support from a number of DJs including Bingo Players, Don Diablo, DVBBS, Inpetto and Zeds Dead. On 5 August, Hawkins and Oliveros returned to the label Tone Diary for the release of their song together titled "Bangover". The track was well received by DJs such as Afrojack, Arty and Dimitri Vegas & Like Mike. On 26 August, Hawkins was featured on the official remix EP for the song "Touched By You" by Paul Oakenfold featuring JHart. On 10 September, Hawkins made his debut on Ultra with the single "Let's Go" in collaboration with the Swedish DJ Sebjak. On 28 October, Hawkins released the single "Hot Steppa" with Henry Fong and Toby Green via Spinnin' Records. On 18 November, Hawkins and Green united once more for a second release together titled "We Got This". After that release, Hawkins released the single "Ulysses" with Pablo Oliveros and Marcus Schössow. The song was released through Steve Angello's record label, Size Records, on 23 December.

On 10 January 2014, Mike Hawkins was featured on the official remix EP of the track "Arena" by J3n5on featuring Walter & Daniels. On 3 February 2014, the DJ released the single "Soldiers" on Sander van Doorn's record
label, Doorn Records. On 17 February, Hawkins was featured on the official remix EP of the single "House of Gold" by Twenty One Pilots. Exactly one month later, he was featured on the official remix EP for the song "Wizard" by Martin Garrix & Jay Hardway. On 7 July 2014, Hawkins released his anthemic single "Revolt" via Doorn Records. All of the song's sales from Beatport were subsequently donated to UNICEF. On 11 August, he released the single "Freedom" in collaboration with Jay Hardway, via Spinnin' Records.

On 2 February, Mike Hawkins released the single "Desert Storm" with the DJ trio, Jetfire, via Doorn Records. On 23 February, alongside Mightyfools, Hawkins released the song "Shots Fired" on Calvin Harris' record label, Fly Eye Records, exclusively via Beatport.

2016: Split from Spinnin' Records and Armada Music

Discography

Singles
 2009: Into Sound [Tone Diary (Spinnin)]
 2009: Dark Matter [Tone Diary (Spinnin)]
 2010: Get You Down [Sound Of Copenhagen]
 2011: Just Be You (with Thomas Sagstad) [Agape Music]
 2011: Cherrycoke (with Pablo Oliveros) [Tone Diary (Spinnin)]
 2011: Not Another Anthem (with Pablo Oliveros) [Tone Diary (Spinnin)]
 2012: Common Ground (with Pablo Oliveros, Gregory Boyd) [Oxygen]
 2012: Slump (with Pablo Oliveros) [Oxygen]
 2012: Floripa [Megaton Records]
 2012: This Is How We Roll (with Pablo Oliveros) [Megaton Records]
 2012: Expand (with Pablo Oliveros) [Megaton Records]
 2013: Trigger Warning [Megaton Records]
 2013: SRSLY Cool (with Dem Slackers) [Megaton Records]
 2013: Jump! (with Pablo Oliveros and Henry Fong) [Hysteria Recs]
 2013: Bangover (with Pablo Oliveros) [Tone Diary (Spinnin)]
 2013: Let's Go (with Sebjak) [Ultra]
 2013: Hot Steppa (with Henry Fong, Toby Green) [Spinnin Records]
 2013: We Got This (with Toby Green) [Megaton Records]
 2013: Ulysses (with Marcus Schossow and Pablo Oliveros) [Size Records]
 2014: Soldiers [DOORN (Spinnin)]
 2014: Revolt [DOORN (Spinnin)]
 2014: Freedom (with Jay Hardway) [Spinnin Records]
 2015: Desert Storm (with Jetfire) [Doorn (Spinnin)]
 2015: Shots Fired (with Mightyfools) [Fly Eye Recordings]
 2015: Lovestruck (with Borgeous) [Spinnin' Records]
 2015: Hit The Streets [Megaton]
 2015: Burn The Maps (with Spencer Tarring) [Megaton]
 2015: World On Fire (with 7 Skies) [Free / Spinnin' Premium]
 2016: I Just Wanna Know [Armada Music]
 2016: Follow (feat. Disfunk & Oisin) [Armada Music]
 2016: Hollywood 2016: Louder [Armada Music]
 2017: Undercover [Vaypor|Armada Music]
 2018: Crocodile [Vaypor|Armada Music]
 2018: Let U Go [Lowly Palace]
 2019: No More Tears [Lowly Palace]
 2019: Mistakes (with Zookeepers) [Spinnin' Records]
 2019: Going Down [Lowly Palace]
 2019: I Want Your Soul [Lowly Palace]
 2020: Blackout [Lowly.]

Remixes
 2010: Trafik - Paid Up In Full (Thomas Sagstad & Mike Hawkins Remix) [GU[MUSIC] Digital (Global Underground)]
 2011: Kenneth Thomas - Drive (feat. Roberta Harrison &. Steven Taetz) (Thomas Sagstad & Mike Hawkins Remix) [Perfecto Records]
 2011: Wally Lopez - Yeah (Thomas Sagstad & Mike Hawkins Remix) [Global Underground]
 2011: Serge Devant and Coyle Girelli - On Your Own (Thomas Sagstad & Mike Hawkins Remix) [Ultra]
 2011: In The Screen - We Are The Night (Thomas Sagstad & Mike Hawkins Remix) [Subliminal Records]
 2012: Ryan Mendoza - Focus (Mike Hawkins Remix) [Tone Diary (Spinnin)]
 2012: Fatman Scoop, Hampenberg, Pitbull, Alexander Brown and Nabiha - Raise The Roof (Mike Hawkins & Pablo Oliveros Ravemode Remix) [disco:wax]
 2012: Sebjak - Follow Me (Mike Hawkins Remix) [Virgin]
 2013: Toby Green - Quillion (Mike Hawkins & Pablo Oliveros Edit) [Megaton]
 2013: Paul Oakenfold featuring J. Hart - Touched By You (Mike Hawkins Radio Edit) [Perfecto Records]
 2014: Martin Garrix and Jay Hardway - Wizard'' (Mike Hawkins Remix) [SPRS]
 2017: Armin Van Buuren - “Sunny Days” (Mike Hawkins Remix)

References

External links 
 
 Beatport

Danish DJs
Danish house musicians
Living people
1991 births
Spinnin' Records artists
Armada Music artists
Danish record producers
Progressive house musicians
Electronic dance music DJs